Held may refer to:

Places
 Held Glacier

People

Arts and media
 Adolph Held (1885–1969), U.S. newspaper editor, banker, labor activist
Al Held (1928–2005), U.S. abstract expressionist painter.
Alexander Held (born 1958), German television and film actor
 Anna Held (1873–1918), Polish stage performer
 Carl Held (born 1931), U.S. actor.
 John Held, Jr. (1889–1958), U.S. illustrator.
 Louis Held (1851–1927), German photojournalist
 Martin Held (1908–1992), German television and film actor
 S. S. Held, French science fiction and fantasy author
 Tom Held (1889–1962), American film editor
 Zeus B. Held (born 1950), German music producer and musician

Education and academia
 David Held (born 1951), British political theorist
 Madeline Held, a British academic

Politics
 Heinrich Held (1868–1938), Minister-President of Bavaria
 Kurt Held (1897–1959), Jewish Communist and writer displaced from Germany during the Second World War
 Marcus Held (born 1977), German politician

Science
 Friedrich Held (1812–1872), German malacologist
 Isaac Held, American meteorologist

Sports
 Bud Held (born 1927), U.S. athlete who competed primarily in the javelin.
 Cornelis den Held (1883–1962), Dutch athlete who competed at the 1908 Summer Olympics in London
 Dan Held (born 1961), Canadian former professional ice hockey centre
 Franz Held (born 1948), German rower who competed in the 1968 and 1972 Summer Olympics
 Henk-Jan Held (born 1967), Dutch volleyball player
 Marcin Held (born 1992), Polish mixed martial artist
 Mel Held (born 1929), American professional baseball player
 Oliver Held (born 1972), German football player
 Paul Held (born 1928), former quarterback in the National Football League
 Sigfried Held (born 1942), German football player
 Woodie Held (1932–2009), Major league baseball player

Arts, entertainment, and media

Films
 De Held, a 2016 Dutch film
 Held einer Nacht, a Czech-German comedy film directed by Martin Frič
 Held Hostage, a Lifetime Movie starring Julie Benz that aired on July 19, 2009
 Held (2020 film), a 2020 fill, direct by Travis Cluff and Chris Lofing

Other arts, entertainment, and media
 "Held" (song), a 1998 song by Smog
 Ein wahrer Held, Op. 69, is an opera in three acts by Giselher Klebe

Other uses
 Held group, a sporadic simple group found by Dieter Held

See also 
 Held for Ransom (disambiguation)
 Held up (disambiguation)
 John Held (disambiguation)

Surnames from nicknames